Enver Idrizi (born 4 August 1966) is a Croatian former karateka and former World Champion. He is an ethnic Albanian, born in Skopje. He was the karate champion of Yugoslavia at the age of 16. The day he won his first medal for Croatia was the day Croatia was officially recognized as an independent country. Because of him, karate has become a popular trophy sport in Croatia since Croatia's independence.

He played a role in the 1996 movie Don't Forget Me, directed by Jakov Sedlar.

Idrizi is a recipient of the Order of Danica Hrvatska with the face of Franjo Bučar.

References

External links

1966 births
Living people
Sportspeople from Skopje
Albanians in North Macedonia
Croatian male karateka
Croatian people of Albanian descent
Croatian people of Macedonian descent